Velké Němčice is a market town in Břeclav District in the South Moravian Region of the Czech Republic. It has about 1,800 inhabitants.

References

Populated places in Břeclav District
Market towns in the Czech Republic